Gorenje Gradišče is a small settlement on the right bank of the Sušica River in the Municipality of Dolenjske Toplice in Slovenia. The municipality is included in the Southeast Slovenia Statistical Region. The area is part of the historical region of Lower Carniola.

References

External links
Gorenje Gradišče on Geopedia

Populated places in the Municipality of Dolenjske Toplice